Mahar is a Sindhi and Punjabi tribe found in Sindh and Punjab, Pakistan.

Mahar tribe was found before British rule in Hindustan, basically known as (Mahar Mujahids)having an ancestry of Rajputs, this tribe conquered land from Jaisalmer India to jamshoro pakistan, which includes deserts of india, thar desert and more than half of sindh pakistan, Mahar family today is living in Ghotki, Sindh, Pakistan, they still follow their traditions and have sea of people following them as they used to do.

References

Social groups of Pakistan
Punjabi tribes
Sindhi tribes